Pseudoalcippe is a genus of passerine birds in the family Sylviidae that are found in Africa.

The genus was erected by the English ornithologist David Armitage Bannerman in 1923. The type species is the Ruwenzori hill babbler.

The genus contains two species:
 African hill babbler (Pseudoalcippe abyssinica)
 Rwenzori hill babbler (Pseudoalcippe atriceps)

These two species were previously considered as members of the family Timaliidae (Old World babblers) but molecular phylogenetic studies have shown that they are closely related to species belonging to the genus Sylvia in the family Sylviidae. Some taxonomists now place both species in Sylvia.

References

 
Bird genera
Sylviidae
 
Taxa named by David Armitage Bannerman
Taxonomy articles created by Polbot